Alyaksandar Lukhvich (born 21 February 1970) is a Belarusian professional football coach and a former player.

Club career
He made his professional debut in the Soviet Top League in 1990 for FC Dinamo Minsk.

Honours
Dinamo Minsk
 Belarusian Premier League champion: 1992, 1992–93, 1993–94, 1994–95, 1995, 1997 
 Belarusian Cup winner: 1993–94

European club competitions
With FC Torpedo Moscow.

 UEFA Cup 2000–01: 2 games.
 UEFA Cup 2001–02: 2 games.
 UEFA Cup 2003–04: 6 games.

References

1970 births
Living people
Soviet footballers
Belarusian footballers
Association football defenders
Belarus international footballers
Belarusian expatriate footballers
Expatriate footballers in Russia
Belarusian Premier League players
Russian Premier League players
FC Dinamo Minsk players
FC KAMAZ Naberezhnye Chelny players
FC Elista players
FC Torpedo Moscow players
FC Darida Minsk Raion players
Belarusian football managers
FC Bereza-2010 managers
FC Minsk managers